This article lists events that occurred during 1926 in Estonia.

Incumbents

Events
 Estonian Radio Symphony Orchestra was established.
 Nõmme gained town rights.
 18 December – Raadio Ringhääling starts regular broadcasts

Births
2 February – Lia Laats, actress (d. 2004)

Deaths

References

 
1920s in Estonia
Estonia
Estonia
Years of the 20th century in Estonia